Sikes Senter is a  shopping mall in Wichita Falls, Texas. It is the only Texas mall within  of Wichita Falls. It was owned and managed by Brookfield Properties Retail Group until 2022, when it was sold to Kohan Retail Investment Group. Anchor stores include At Home, and JCPenney.

History
Construction on Sikes Senter began in 1973, with Dillard's and JCPenney as the first anchor stores. The mall opened in 1974, with Perkins department store joining as a third anchor in 1975. The Perkins store became a second Dillard's, while Bealls was later added. Sears joined as an anchor in 1991, with additions in the 2000s including Books-A-Million and Old Navy.

Bealls closed in 2011, as did New York & Company. Also, the Old Navy in the mall reduced its floor space by 25 percent. Despite the loss of these stores, the mall maintained occupancy higher than the national average. The former Bealls became The Shoe Department Encore in 2012. Sears closed on December 20, 2015 and became At Home on April 21, 2016.

On May 12, 2022, it was announced that Dillard's would be closing both locations in summer 2022 which will leave At Home and JCPenney as the only anchors left.

Anchors
At Home
JCPenney

References

External links
Official site

Shopping malls in Texas
Shopping malls established in 1974
Buildings and structures in Wichita Falls, Texas
1974 establishments in Texas
Kohan Retail Investment Group